Anton Calenic (born 1 February 1943) is a Romanian sprint canoeist who competed in the late 1960s. At the 1968 Summer Olympics in Mexico City, he won a silver medal in the K-4 1000 m event.

Calenic also won a gold medal in the K-4 1000 m event at the 1966 ICF Canoe Sprint World Championships in East Berlin.

References

1943 births
Canoeists at the 1968 Summer Olympics
Living people
Olympic canoeists of Romania
Olympic silver medalists for Romania
Romanian male canoeists
Romanian people of Russian descent
Olympic medalists in canoeing
ICF Canoe Sprint World Championships medalists in kayak
Medalists at the 1968 Summer Olympics